The Towanda Area School District is a small, rural public school district located in central Bradford County, Pennsylvania. It covers the Boroughs of Towanda and Monroe and Franklin Township, Monroe Township, Towanda Township, North Towanda Township, Wysox Township, Asylum Township and Standing Stone Township. According to 2019 federal census data, it serves a resident population of 10,819. In 2009, the district residents’ per capita income was $17,634, while the median family income was $41,286. In the Commonwealth, the median family income was $49,501 and the United States median family income was $49,445, in 2010.

The district operates Towanda Junior/Senior High School (7th-12th), J. Andrew Morrow Elementary School (K-2nd) and Towanda Elementary School (3rd-6th). In the junior and senior year, Towanda Area students may enroll in a vocational-technical course at the Northern Tier Career Center.

Extracurriculars
The district offers a variety of clubs, activities and sports

Sports
The district offered the following in 2012:

Baseball	
Basketball, boys and girls
Cross country, boys and girls
Football
Golf, boys and girls
Soccer, boys and girls
Softball, girls
Swimming and diving, boys and girls
Tennis, boys and girls
Track and field, boys and girls
Wrestling, boys
Volleyball, girls

In June 2010,  the school district's fifth- and sixth-grade basketball program was transferred to the YMCA of Bradford County. Additionally, the Board eliminated paying for meals for students on trips to participate in athletic competitions and eliminated school district funding to send students to national competitions.

References

School districts in Bradford County, Pennsylvania